Daniela Filipiová (born 9 August 1957) is a Czech architect and politician. She served as Minister of Health for the Czech Republic from 23 January 2009 to 8 May 2009. A member of the Civic Democratic Party (ODS) Filipiová was a Senator representing Prague 8.

Filipiová graduated from the Czech Technical University in Prague in 1983 with a degree in architecture. She married and had a daughter, but was bothered by persistent back problems. In 1986 she underwent spinal cord surgery which left her paralyzed from the waist down. Nonetheless, she continued her career, remarried and had a second daughter. Filipiová is the author of several books: Život bez bariér (Life Without Barriers), Tvorba bezbariérové prostředí (Creating a barrier-free environment) and Projektujeme bez bariér (Designing without Barriers).

Minister of Health
On 23 January 2009, she assumed the position of Minister of Health under Prime Minister Mirek Topolánek replacing Tomáš Julínek. No new policy changes were made under her administration, but she sought to negotiate to get as much of the Julínek reforms through as possible. She officially resigned on 26 March 2009 when the government of PM Topolánek fell, but continued to serve in the caretaker government until 8 May 2009 when the government of Prime Minister Jan Fischer took office and Dana Jurásková became the Minister of Health.

Notes

External links 
 Daniela Filipiová personal website
 Official biography Úřadu vlády České republiky (Czech Government Office)

1957 births
Health ministers of the Czech Republic
Living people
Civic Democratic Party (Czech Republic) Senators
Czech Technical University in Prague alumni
Women government ministers of the Czech Republic
Politicians from Prague
Czech people with disabilities
21st-century Czech women politicians